The 2017 James Madison Dukes football team represented James Madison University during the 2017 NCAA Division I FCS football season. They were led by second-year head coach Mike Houston and played their home games at Bridgeforth Stadium and Zane Showker Field. They are a member of the Colonial Athletic Association (CAA). They finished the season 14–1 overall with an 8–0 mark in CAA play to win the conference title and also finished undefeated in the regular season for the second time in school history (the other being 1975, before the Dukes joined the NCAA). They received an automatic bid to the FCS playoffs, where they defeated Stony Brook, Weber State, and South Dakota State to advance to the National Championship Game for the second straight season, where they were defeated 17–13 by North Dakota State.

Previous season
In 2016, the Dukes finished the season with a 14–1 record, including an 8–0 mark in CAA play to win the conference title. They went undefeated in FCS play with their only loss coming to FBS North Carolina. They received an automatic bid to the FCS playoffs, where they defeated New Hampshire, Sam Houston State, and five-time defending champions North Dakota State to advance to the National Championship Game, where they defeated Youngstown State. This was their first national championship since 2004.

Schedule

Game summaries

at East Carolina

East Tennessee State

Norfolk State

Maine

at Delaware

Villanova

at William & Mary

New Hampshire

at Rhode Island

Richmond

at Elon

FCS Playoffs

Second Round–Stony Brook

Quarterfinals–Weber State

Semifinals–South Dakota State

National Championship–North Dakota State

Roster

Ranking movements

References

James Madison
James Madison Dukes football seasons
Colonial Athletic Association football champion seasons
James Madsion
James Madison Dukes football